Luis Medina (born 17 October 1973) is a Bolivian swimmer. He competed in three events at the 1992 Summer Olympics.

References

1973 births
Living people
Bolivian male swimmers
Olympic swimmers of Bolivia
Swimmers at the 1992 Summer Olympics
Place of birth missing (living people)
20th-century Bolivian people